East Lindfield is a suburb on the Upper North Shore of Sydney in the state of New South Wales, Australia. East Lindfield is located 13 kilometres north-west of the Sydney Central Business District in the local government area of Ku-ring-gai Council. Lindfield is a separate suburb to the west sharing the postcode of 2070.

History 

Lindfield means "lime tree field". The Lindfield area was settled in the 1850s. The name derives from the native town of early landowner Mr List, who named his house after Lindfield, Sussex, England. When the railway line came through the area in the 1890s, the name of the property was used to identify the station and neighbourhood.

Suburban development in East Lindfield occurred mostly in the 1950s and 1960s, so most of the houses in East Lindfield are newer and have a different style to those of Lindfield, which mostly pre-date World War II.

East Lindfield became a separate suburb from Lindfield when it was  gazetted on 5 August 1994.

Transport

Lindfield railway station is on the North Shore railway line of the Sydney Trains network. Busways run bus routes 206, 207, 208 and 209 to East Lindfield. East Lindfield is also home to Lindfield East Public School.

At the 2016 census, 25.6% of employed people used public transport as at least one of their methods of travel to work and 58.3% travelled by car.

Population
According to the 2016 census, there were 3,711 residents in East Lindfield.

 Many were families: there was a high rate of married people in East Lindfield, with 60.7% of residents aged 15 years and over being married (the national average was 48.1%), and children under 15 constituted 22.4% of the population (the national average is 18.7%).
 The most common ancestries in East Lindfield were English 24.7%, Australian 19.6%, Chinese 17.4%, Irish 7.5% and Scottish 6.6%. 61.1% of people in East Lindfield were born in Australia. The most common countries of birth were China 7.7%, England 6.7% and Hong Kong 3.5%.  68.7% of people only spoke English at home. Other languages spoken at home included Mandarin 10.6% and Cantonese 7.9%.
 The most common responses for religion were No Religion 33.0%, Anglican 21.5% and Catholic 19.2%, Not stated 5.7% and Buddhism 3.6%.
 East Lindfield residents had high incomes, with a median weekly household income of $3,047 compared to the national average of $1,438. There was considerable participation in voluntary work, with 31.1% of people doing official voluntary work in the previous 12 months, which is significantly higher than the national average of 19.0%.

Notable residents

Steven Solomon (born 1993), Olympic sprinter

References

Suburbs of Sydney